Eleonora Di Nezza is an Italian mathematician, a CNRS researcher at the Centre de mathématiques Laurent-Schwartz and a professor of mathematics at Ecole Polytechnique, in Palaiseau, France. Her research is at the intersection of various branches of mathematics including complex and differential geometry, and focuses on Kahler geometry.

Education and career 
Di Nezza earned her Master's degree in Mathematics from the Sapienza University of Rome, and did her doctoral research between the University of Rome Tor Vergata and Paul Sabatier University in Toulouse, France, during which reunified results on fractional Sobolev spaces. Her dissertation was on 
Geometry of complex Monge-Ampère equations on compact Kähler manifolds.

After receiving her PhD, she became a postdoctoral fellow at Imperial College, in London, UK under a Marie Curie Fellowship, during which she joined the Mathematical Sciences Research Institute in Berkeley, United States. In 2017 moved to France to join the Institute of Advanced Scientific Studies before becoming a lecturer at Sorbonne University and a professor of mathematics at Ecole Polytechnique. She was awarded the prestigious CNRS bronze Medal in 2021.

References

External links 

 https://www.ihes.fr/entretien-avec-eleonora-di-nezza/

Italian women mathematicians
Living people
Year of birth missing (living people)